Afroarabiella is a genus of moths in the family Cossidae.

Species
Subgenus Afroarabiella
Afroarabiella buchanani (Rothschild, 1921)
Afroarabiella fanti (Hampson, 1910)
Afroarabiella namaquensis Yakovlev, 2014
Afroarabiella ochracea (Gaede, 1929)
Afroarabiella politzari Yakovlev, 2008
Afroarabiella tahamae (Wiltshire, 1949)
Afroarabiella tanzaniae Yakovlev, 2011
Afroarabiella ukambani Yakovlev, 2008
Subgenus Meyoarabiella Yakovlev, 2008
Afroarabiella meyi Yakovlev, 2008

References

Yakovlev, R.V. 2008: Afroarabiella gen. nov. – a new genus of Cossidae (Lepidoptera) from the African and Arabian Peninsula. Atalanta, 39(1-4): 389–395.
Yakovlev, R.V. 2014: A new species of Afroarabiella Yakovlev, 2008 (Lepidoptera, Cossidae) from the Republic of South Africa, including a world catalogue of the genus. Zootaxa, 3793(2): 297–300.

External links

Natural History Museum Lepidoptera generic names catalog

Cossinae
Moth genera